is a railway station on the Hohi Main Line operated by JR Kyushu in Kita-ku, Kumamoto, Japan.

Lines

Layout 
The station consists of two side platforms serving two tracks at grade. The station building is a modern functional concrete structure which houses a waiting area and a staffed ticket window. Access to the opposite platform is by means of a level crossing. A bike shed is provided outside the station building.

Management of the station has been outsourced to the JR Kyushu Tetsudou Eigyou Co., a wholly owned subsidiary of JR Kyushu specialising in station services. It staffs the ticket window which is equipped with a Midori no Madoguchi facility.

Adjacent stations

History
Japanese National Railways (JNR) opened the station on 1 October 1981 as an additional station on the existing track of the Hōhi Main Line. With the privatization of JNR on 1 April 1987, the station came under the control of JR Kyushu.

Passenger statistics
In fiscal 2016, the station was used by an average of 2,080 passengers daily (boarding passengers only), and it ranked 88th among the busiest stations of JR Kyushu.

See also
List of railway stations in Japan

References

External links
Musashizuka Station (JR Kyushu)

Railway stations in Kumamoto Prefecture
Railway stations in Japan opened in 1981